Mary Isabella Lee (18 June 1871–7 August 1939) was a New Zealand servant, dressmaker, coalminer and homemaker. She was born in Coatbridge, Lanarkshire, Scotland on 18 June 1871.

References

1871 births
1939 deaths
New Zealand coal miners
Servants
People from Coatbridge
Scottish emigrants to New Zealand
New Zealand domestic workers